Ren or REN may refer to:

Abbreviations 
 Orenburg Tsentralny Airport, IATA code REN, civil airport in Russia
 Redes Energéticas Nacionais (REN), Portuguese company
 Renanthera, abbreviated as Ren, orchid genus 
 Ringer equivalence number (REN), a number which denotes the loading effect of a telephone ringer on a telephone line

Geography 
 Ren County, in Hebei, China
 Ren, Iran, a village in Kerman Province, Iran
 Ren (building), a high-rise residential building in Seattle, Washington, United States

Science, technology and medicine 
 REN (gene)
 Ren, in anatomy, a kidney
 Ren (command), a shell command in computing

People 
 A diminutive of the given name Renée
 Ren (surname) (任), Chinese surname
 MC Ren, rapper from the group NWA
 Ren (singer), member of South Korean boy band NU'EST
 Ren Gill, UK singer-songwriter, rapper, poet, producer and multi-instrumentalist. 
 Renforshort, Canadian singer formerly known as Ren
 , Japanese traditional calligrapher
 , Japanese businessman
 , Japanese actor
 , Japanese politician
 , Japanese football player
 , Japanese actor
 ,  Japanese baseball pitcher
 , Japanese baseball player 
 , Japanese footballer 
 , Japanese singer and member of JO1
 , Japanese footballer 
 , Japanese singer, actor, and member of Snow Man
 , Japanese wrestler
 , Japanese mixed martial artist
 , Japanese baseball player
 , Japanese footballer 
 ,Japanese footballer
 , Japanese singer, actor, and member of King & Prince
 , Japanese footballer
 , Japanese football player
 , Japanese footballer
 , Japanese racing driver

Religion 
 Ren, "name, identity", an Ancient Egyptian concept of the soul or spirit
 Ren (Confucianism), Confucian concept

Fictional characters

Single name 
 Ren, the titular heroine from the  fantasy webseries Ren: The Girl with the Mark from Mythica Entertainment and Kate Madison
 Ren (Tsukihime), a character from the game Kagetsu Tohya and Melty Blood: Re-ACT
 Ren, son of Primus, protagonist of the animated series The Pirates of Dark Water
 Ren (Star Wars) (not to be confused with Kylo Ren), a character in the Star Wars franchise

First name 
 Ren Akiyama of Kamen Rider
 Ren Amamiya, the name used for Joker, the main protagonist, in the anime adaptation of Persona 5
 Ren Ashbell, an alias used by the protagonist of Bladedance of Elementalers, Kamito Kazehaya
 Ren Gottlieb, a character from the Australian soap Neighbours
 Ren Höek, a fictional chihuahua from the Nickelodeon animated series The Ren & Stimpy Show
 Ren Honjo, a character from the manga, anime, and film NANA
 Ren Mihashi, main character from the manga, anime and game from Big Windup!
 Ren Jinguuji, a character from the anime, game and manga from Uta no Prince-sama
 Ren Karas, a character from the anime and manga Element Hunters
 Ren Krawler, the Darkus protagonist from the animated series Bakugan: Gundalian Invaders
 Ren, a character from the game and anime "DRAMAtical Murder"
 Ren, a character from the video game Oxenfree
 Ren Kosaka, main character from the 2008 Japanese tokusatsu television series, Go-ongers
 Ren Maka, a character from the anime Chibi Vampire
 Ren McCormack, the main character from the film Footloose
 Ren Ren Ren Nagusaran Renshia Rurunnren Nakora, heroine of DearS
 Ren Sohma, the mother of Akito Sohma in the manga Fruits Basket
 Ren Stevens, a character from Even Stevens
 Ren Tsuruga, character in the manga Skip Beat
 Tao Len, sometimes romanized as Tao Ren, a character in Shaman King
 Ren Suzugamori, a character in the anime series Cardfight!! Vanguard

Last name 
 Wuying Ren, a character from Shenmue II
 Kylo Ren, a character from the Star Wars sequel trilogy
 Hakuryuu Ren, Fourth Imperial Prince of Kou in the anime Magi: The Labyrinth of Magic and Magi: The Kingdom of Magic
 Lie Ren, a character from the American animated series RWBY

Other uses 
 Ren (fictional weapon), an alternate term for lightsaber in the Star Wars franchise
 REN TV, a Russian free-to-air television network
 Ren - meaning to connect or link in Japanese culture - see also renga / renku
 Ren - the name given to the Chinese sports car Techrules Ren.

See also 
 Renn (disambiguation)
 Rennie (disambiguation)

Japanese unisex given names